Focus may refer to the following notable people:
Focus Gwede (died 2011), head of Malawi Police Force
Georges Focus, 17th century French engraver and painter